The Hambletonian Oaks is a premier harness racing event for three-year-old Standardbred female trotters first run in 1971. The race is operated by The Hambletonian Society, Inc.  which also operates the Hambletonian Stakes for three-year-old for male horses and the Breeders Crown series.

Historical race events
The Hambletonian Society, Inc. is a Group Stakeholder of the Racing Medication and Testing Consortium (RMTC). Beginning in 1991, the Society's Board of Directors banned any horse from competing in the Hambletonioan Oaks using the either of the medications Butazolidin or Lasix.

In 2016, the driver and trainer combination of Yannick Gingras and Hall of Fame inductee Jimmy Takter set a record when they won the Oaks together for the third consecutive year. The team also won the 2017 Oaks, which made it the fourth consecutive year.

Only 6 of the 36 Hambletonian Oaks run through 2017 have been won by a trainer born in the United States. The foreign born winning trainers have come from Sweden (16), Canada (10), Norway (3) and New Zealand (1).

Race locations
1971 - 1980: State Fair, DuQuoin, Illinois
1981 - present: Meadowlands Racetrack, East Rutherford, New Jersey

Records
 Most wins by a driver
 5 – Yannick Gingras (2014, 2015, 2016, 2017, 2018)

 Most wins by an owner
 3 – Marvin Katz & Alexander J. Libfeld (1998, 2998, 2016) & Castleton Farm (1971, 1973, 1974)

 Most wins by a trainer
 8 – Jimmy Takter (1994, 2003, 2006, 2014, 2015, 2016, 2017, 2018, 2020)

 Most wins by a groom
 2 – Jim Summers (1985, 1997)

 Stakes record
 1:50.0 – Manchengo (2018)

Winners of the Hambletonian Oaks

1.2020: Raced to full completion amid low attendance due to the COVID-19 pandemic.

References

External links
YouTube video of the  2016 Hambletonian Oaks
 

Recurring sporting events established in 1971
Harness racing in the United States
Horse races in New Jersey
Harness races for three-year-old trotters
Meadowlands Racetrack
Horse races in Illinois
1971 establishments in Illinois